Oluwatobiloba Alagbe Adefunyibomi (born 24 April 2000), also known as Tobi Alagbe, is a Nigerian professional footballer who plays as a defender for Super League Greece club Asteras Tripolis.

Career
On 1 July 2021, Alagbe moved to Luxembourg National Division club Jeunesse Esch on a one-year loan.

References

External links
 

2000 births
Living people
Nigerian footballers
Association football defenders
Asteras Tripolis F.C. players
Jeunesse Esch players
Super League Greece players
Luxembourg National Division players
Nigerian expatriate footballers
Nigerian expatriate sportspeople in Greece
Nigerian expatriate sportspeople in Luxembourg
Expatriate footballers in Greece
Expatriate footballers in Luxembourg